The Lualaba worm lizard (Monopeltis adercae) is a species of amphisbaenian in the family Amphisbaenidae. The species is endemic to the Democratic Republic of the Congo.

Etymology
The specific name, adercae, is in honor of Bernard Max Aderca, who was a Belgian geologist and paleontologist.

Geographic range
M. adercae is found in southern Democratic Republic of the Congo, in the vicinity of Mulongo.

Description

Reproduction
The mode of reproduction of M. adercae is unknown.

References

Further reading
De Witte G-F (1953). "Exploration du Parc National de l'Upemba. Mission G. F. de Witte en collaboration avec W. Adams, A. Janssens, L. van Meel et R. Verheyen (1946–1949). Reptiles ". Institut des Parcs Nationaux du Congo Belge (Brussels) 6: 1–322. ("Monopeltis adercæ", new species, pp. 82–83, Figures 16A–16D). (in French).
Gans C (2005). "Checklist and Bibliography of the Amphisbaenia of the World". Bulletin of the American Museum of Natural History (289): 1–130. (Monopeltis adercae, p. 34).

Monopeltis
Endemic fauna of the Democratic Republic of the Congo
Reptiles of the Democratic Republic of the Congo
Reptiles described in 1953
Taxa named by Gaston-François de Witte